Poasi Mataele Tei (born 4 October 1967) is a Tongan politician and former Member of the Legislative Assembly of Tonga.

Tei was educated at the University of the South Pacific in Suva, Fiji, graduating with a Bachelor of Arts and an MBA. Before entering politics he worked for the Statistics Department, as an accountant for the Tonga Co-operative Federation, Pacific Finance and Investment, Tonga Water Board and Tonga Airport Limited.

Political career 
He was first elected to Parliament as a Democratic Party of the Friendly Islands candidate at the 2014 Tongan general election, and was appointed as Minister for Public Enterprises in the ʻAkilisi Pōhiva Cabinet. In 2015 he attempted to remove two nobles as directors of the Tonga Broadcasting Commission, but the decision was later overturned by the courts. He was re-elected at the 2017 election and appointed as Minister of Energy, Environment, Information and Climate Change (MEIDEEC).

Following the death of ʻAkilisi Pōhiva Tei supported Pohiva Tuʻiʻonetoa for Prime Minister. He retained his portfolios in the Tuʻiʻonetoa's Cabinet.

He was re-elected in the 2021 election. On 28 December 2021 he was appointed to the Cabinet of Siaosi Sovaleni as Deputy Prime Minister, Minister for Public Enterprises, and Minister for Meteorology, Energy, Information, Disaster Management, Environment, Communications and Climate Change (MEIDECC). On 13 May 2022 his election was declared void after the Supreme Court found him guilty of three counts of bribery in an election petition. The conviction was stayed pending appeal on 26 May 2022. On 9 August 2022 his appeal was dismissed, and his election confirmed as void. He was formally unseated by Parliament on 10 August. His wife Dulcie Elaine Tei won the resulting by-election.

References

Living people
Members of the Legislative Assembly of Tonga
Government ministers of Tonga
Energy ministers of Tonga
Environment ministers of Tonga
Deputy Prime Ministers of Tonga
Democratic Party of the Friendly Islands politicians
University of the South Pacific alumni
1967 births
Independent politicians in Tonga